= Vijay K. Garg =

American computer scientist

Vijay K. Garg is an American computer scientist and engineer, who is currently the Cullen Trust for Higher Education Endowed Professor #5 at the University of Texas at Austin.
